There were several kings of Strathclyde, Cumbria or Alt Clut whose names are sometimes given as Owain, Owen, Eógan and so on.

Eugein I of Alt Clut (Eugein son of Beli) (7th century), king of Alt Clut who defeated Domnall Brecc at Strathcarron in 642
Eugein II of Alt Clut (Eugein son of Dumnuagal) (8th century), king of Alt Clut
Owain ap Dyfnwal (fl. 934), King of the Cumbrians
Owain ap Dyfnwal (died 1015), King of the Cumbrians
Owain Foel (fl. 1018), King of the Cumbrians